Cassandra Gava (born April 28, 1959) is an American actress and producer best known for her performance as the witch in the 1982 film Conan the Barbarian, and as the slave woman Alessa in High Road to China. She appeared in 21 films between 1979 and 1998. She also appears on the cover of the Jefferson Starship album Spitfire, and is credited as "dragon princess" in the liner notes. Gava appeared in Taxi as Desiree in the 1981 episode "Vienna Waits".

Partial filmography
 Conan the Barbarian (1982) -- The Witch (as Cassandra Gaviola)
 Night Shift (1982) -- J.J.
 The Black Room (1982) -- Bridget (as Cassandra Gaviola)
 High Road to China (1983) -- Alessa
 The Game (1988) -- Dawn
 Dead By Dawn (1988)
 Mortal Passions (1989) -- Cinda
 The Amityville Curse (video) (1990) -- Abigail
 Last Man Standing (1996) -- Barmaid
 Mysteria (2011) -- Rose

External links
 

1959 births
20th-century American actresses
21st-century American actresses
American actresses of Filipino descent
American film actresses
American television actresses
Actresses from San Francisco
Living people